Niemysłów  (1943–1945 German Briesenruh) is a village in the administrative district of Gmina Poddębice, within Poddębice County, Łódź Voivodeship, in central Poland.

The village has a population of 390.

References

Villages in Poddębice County